Rockville Hills Regional Park is a 633-acre (~256 hectare, 2.56 square kilometer) regional park in the city of Fairfield, Solano County, California, United States. The park is known for its volcanic rocks, thin topsoil, grasses, and blue oak trees. There are also oak woodlands, grassland savannas, chaparral and some aquatic habitats.

History
During the 1960s the city of Fairfield was going to build a golf course on the land; however they decided to transform the area into a trailed park instead. In 2012 nearly 200 oak and manzanita trees were removed at the park at the behest of PG&E, the major California power company, to avoid sparking fires. In 2015 it was reported to be one of the best mountain biking spots in the San Francisco Bay Area by the Sacramento Bee.

In 2018 the park was closed due to a red flag warning, a wildfire probability warning. This is despite the fact the park has never suffered from a conflagration. Also in 2018, the local 4H club cleaned garbage, planted endemic trees, and planted moss spores over graffiti covered stones.

Wildlife
The park is home to cows and birds in addition to deer, fox, waterfowl, hawks and bobcats.

References

https://outroots.co/hiking-rockville-hills-regional-park-ca/

External links
official page

Parks in Solano County, California
Fairfield, California